Berts bravader  is a diary novel written by Anders Jacobsson and Sören Olsson and originally published in 1991. It tells the story of Bert Ljung from 2 January to 1 January during the years he turns 14 and 15, covering the spring term in the 7th grade, the upcoming summer break, and the autumn term in the 8th grade.

No specific calendar year almanac is used. As standard, Bert opens the chapters with the words "Tjena!" and finishes with "Tjena, tjena – mittbena". Bert writes diary for each week during this calendar year, not each day like the previous, but in turn the chapters are longer than in the Bert's betraktelser trilogy. It also aired over the Unga Efter tre radio programme back in the early 1990s.

Book cover
The book cover shows a grass-piece next to the beach, where Bert is on a blanket, where he has placed a T-shirt with the text "Heman Hunters", and Emilia lies upon Bert's stomach. From under another blanket, two eyes show up. Further away, a little child runs towards the water with a plastic dinosaur. Two girls are sunbathing topless, while two guys watch. An older man also watches, trying to hide his watching from his wife behind a newspaper. At beachside, a macho guys tries to impress two girls. At waterside, bathing and boating recreation occurs. Sun is shining, and birds are moving in the sky. At the book title text, a bird that has caught a fish is seen. Under a black blanket, two feet appear, probably Åke who opposes Sunbathing in general. Also on Bert and Emilia's blanket are a bag, and a magazine with the text "Brudar" ("chicks") and two breasts. Next to Emilia's left foot are two flippers in the grass, and a frog is seen (Åke has two water frogs, Hasse and Lasse).

Plot
The book begins on 2 January with Bert writing in his new diary. Since late October last year, Bert is in love with a girl in the same class at school named Emilia, despite the other guys thinks she is a "wimp" because of good gradeing and school, good behavior and ironed clothes, and Bert knows about the risk. In January, Bert sends Emilia a letter, with the nasty "Höpp och skit" finishing lines. When Bert regrets posting the letter, he tries to pick it up from the letter box, but gets stuck with his arm in the letter box, and gets attacked by two snowball tossing younger children. Bert bribes a bypassing guy with 25 SEK to pick up Åke, who arrives with plastic explosives, and Bert has to bribe Åke with 25 SEK to not use the plastic explosive, and instead pick up a hacksaw and saw apart the letter box, and when that attempt fails, Kurre from the petrol station has to assist to break Bert free.

Bert re-posts the letter, but once again forgets changing the finishing lines. Bert pounds his head in the letter box, swearing. From a distance, the sound of sirens appear, and Bert realize the local police is about to arrive, to investigate what has happened. Bert runs home. Soon, Bert, Åke and Lill-Erik travel away by bus to go slalom skiing in the hills, but Åke rides a pulk and falls out into the mogul skiing slope before ending up at hospital.

Emilia asks to come over to Bert and help him with homework (Bert tries to smuggle Emilia into his apartment), about the constitution of Sweden, and thanks Bert for the letter he sent her, which he takes for being a name day letter, and how she wrote it for her parents.

In March, Bert has a parent-free video evening with Åke, Lill-Erik, Torleif, Sandra, Camilla, Lisa and Emilia where Lill-Erik is forgotten in Bert's parents' bed, and later during the same month, Bert's school class has a supply teacher in Swedish called Willy, and many girls seem to like him. When Emilia think he's cute, sighs and draws heart on heart symbols on the desk Bert tells Willy that some " unruly elements of the class" vandalize the desks with doodle.

On 2 April, Lill-Erik walks over to Olga in class 5 C and asks to get together, and then tells her it's just an April fool. Olga replies with reminding him such jokes are only allowed on 1 April. During Easter Bert notices his old female friend Paulina in town, and Björna throws snuff after her and blames it on Bert. Lill-Erik is not in sight, fearing the Easter Bunny. After the Easter break, Bert notices Emilia accidentally having cut herself in her finger during the break, and walks towards her pat her lightly on her hand and say something kind, when he accidentally gets stuck with his own finger in the bandage, and removes his finger, which brings Emilia's thumb with him, which goes bent backward and swaged. Emilia is required to go with her arm in esmarch bandage for weeks, and words can't describe how much Bert wants to apologize, and instead he just walks away.

Soccer season kicks off, and Bert's team has lost the opening games with the results of 0–12, 1–9 and 0–24. Åke is kicked out of the team by the coach Gordon for throwing a rubber doll into the soccer ground in the third game, instead of playing himself. Åke soon recruits 9-year-old Charlie, who scores all goals when Bert's team wins the game, 3–1. On 8 May Åke celebrates his name day by trying to "increase" the speed of his bicycle by removing the chain and the breaks, and take off from the central hill before falling right into the watchmaker's display window. When being required to pay a bill, he chops down a flag pole outside the town hall struggling against "corruption ".

During Pentecost Eve, Bert meets Emilia at the Domus underwear department, when she invites Bert for a midday over Pentecost Monday (in those day a public holiday in Sweden). Bert believes that when eating at well-educated doctors (which Emilia's parents are), you are suspected to know good behaviour, table manners and eat with and eat with knife and fork while talking financial situation of Sweden and blame it on the trade unions. Bert accepts the invitation, and buys white carnations to Emilia's mother. When arriving, Bert eats with knife and fork, while Emilia's father eats with his fingers.

During summer, Bert takes his first summer job, as "ice cream guy" (Swedish: "glassgosse") at Bengtssons Café, which Bert first mistakes as "glassig gosse" ("flashy guy"), and wears a white tie and buys a cigar (Note: Underage smoking was legal in Sweden until 1997) which he hears during the job interview, when he learns it's all about an "ice cream guy", and that he can't smoke. Emilia (who runs the "Motionstrampen" running event), Lill-Erik and Åke all appear to buy ice cream. Bert also goes to Denmark with his family. Bert is also out with his "gang", and officially goes together with Emilia after some summetime romances at the beach (who are also depicted on the book's back cover) and the town park, where Nadja's raggare brothers appear and teases Bert before surprisingly shouts on them to go away. Bert's pet turtle Ove seems to have problems with Emilia, and poops her in her fist. Åke takes a summer job as a comedian at a factory, but is kicked out after telling jokes about unemployed people on the day after 500 employees had been fired.

When the 8th grade starts, Bert's class has family and consumer science, and after behaving bad towards the schoolteacher, Lill-Erik is only allowed theoretical education. By September, Bert and the other guys ride bicycle through town, calling themselves "Cykelgalningarna" ("Bicycle maniacs") and depict themselves as a "cool gang with rusty handlebars and without retroreflectors", who shout "–Halka-kalka". For his 14th birthday, Åke gets a moped (illegal to drive in Sweden before turning 15).

By October Lill-Erik tells he has begun weightlifting, but soon it becomes clear it is not with strong guys in the upper levels of the Swedish primary school, but rather with 3 kilo weights with students from the lower levels of the Swedish primary school. He stops when a guy in the second grade threatens to pull the arm of him. Lill-Erik also gets a girlfriend, 7th grader Hildur who has red hair and glasses, and even if Bert has Emilia, he thinks Hildur is cute. For a while, it seems like Lill-Erik is to move away when his father is offered better wages as a projectionist, but wage negotiations finally fail.

Bert's great grandmother Beda on Gotland dies on 14 October, and is buried on Gotland the upcoming week, Bert's family travel over to Gotland and attend the funeral. Bert's band, the Heman Hunters, offers to attend the funeral and play calm rock ballads, but instead a Gotland native blows in a trumpet. By late October, the school nurse takes blood samples from the pupils of Bert's class do, where the guys are screaming to scare each other.

Bert does his PRAO at a local newspaper in November. Heman Hunters play at the "Hjorten" youth club (but Åke mistakes the name for "Lorten", Swedish for "muck"), which Bert depicts in the newspaper, as "Treb Gnujl" (his own name written backwards). During a school test later during the month, where the students will write their own story, Åke "steals" a story from August Strindberg, "Fräknige Julius". Bert writes and about a man watching TV. When he can't come to a good end, he continues the stories nuclear weapon and everyone dies.

On 3 December, Bert's school plays an ice hockey tournament. In the opening game, the opponent team is leading, 12–1, when Lill-Erik is sent to the penalty box twice for hitting an opponent. Bert turns angry on Lill-Erik, and they start to fight before Bert scores seven goals at pure anger, and Bert's school wins, 13–12. In the second game, Bert is sent to the penalty box for tackling his teammate Lill-Erik, and swearing at the referee. Bert is blamed when his school loses, 0–8, and is knocked out of the tournament.

Later in December, Bert sends Emilia a poetry book, with love poems and blank pages where own poems can be written. Bert regrets writing: "Snoppen sitter på kroppen och mår toppen" ("The penis is on the body and feels great").

Dressed as Santa Claus elves, Bert, Åke and Lill-Erik go out caroling an afternoon. Åke has stolen a Red Cross collection box in November, and tricks people that the money are aimed at "charity", which actually is pieces to Åke's old, and together they collect 134 SEK and 2 Finnish markka (when Lill-Erik sings Vi äro musikanter with Finnish-sounding voice break). On 22 December, the Heman Hunters hold a Christmas party.

Torleif announces he will move, playing a funeral tune on his flute, as the entire band cheers. Torleif replies with kicking Åke out into the snow. All band members run out into the winternight, and the member throws themselves naked into the snow, shouting out loud. A female neighbour is awakened, watches out of the windows and calls the police.

When the book ends, it's 1 January of the upcoming calendar year, and Bert tells about last night's New Year's party at Lill-Erik, whose parents aren't at home. Invited are Bert, Åke and 24 other people (among them Emilia and Torleif). Lill-Erik is worried for objects breaking apart. Bert and Emilia give Lill-Erik an aspirin with rose hip soup before sending him to bed. Bert and Emilia then go to Lill-Erik's mother's sewing room to be alone, when Åke shows up. Bert and Emilia then go into the basement, when Torleif appears and says he will stay in touch when moving. Both Bert and Emilia want to continue the romance, when Åke mixes with a sewing cotton  causing the electricity to go off, and Åke forces Bert to assist him holding a candle while Åke searches the telephone directory, finally finding a half-drunk electrician who fixes the power, and for pay he asks for kisses by the girls. Åke picks up a wig and kisses the electrician on his hand. The lights return at 00:15, everyone has missed the bells striking twelve, and soon everyone starts leaving.

Bert and Emilia walk home together in the New Year's night, and before splitting up for the night they give each other a delayed New Year's resolution, to always stay together for the rest of their lives. After kissing each other goodbye, they both continue walking in different directions, towards their own homes. Continuing home alone, Bert on his way spots a "very hot" girl at the all-day long-open store "Harrys Plejs". Bert and the girl look upon each other, and Bert thinks of Emilia and finally comes to realize that probably never used to believe in the "nonsense" of New Year's resolutions after all.

References 

Berts bravader, Rabén & Sjögren, 1991

1991 children's books
Novels set in Denmark
Sequel novels
Bert books
Rabén & Sjögren books
Novels set in Gotland
1991 Swedish novels